Synuchus semirufus is a species of ground beetle in the subfamily Harpalinae. It was described by Casey in 1913.

References

Synuchus
Beetles described in 1913